The men's rugby sevens tournament at the 2017 Southeast Asian Games was held from 19 to 20 August in Malaysia. In this tournament, 6 Southeast Asian teams will play in the men's competition.

All matches will be played at Petaling Jaya Stadium in Petaling Jaya.

Competition schedule
The following was the competition schedule for the men's rugby sevens competitions:

Participating nations
The following six teams participated for the men's competition.

  (CAM)
  (INA)
  (MAS)
  (PHI)
  (SGP)
  (THA)

Draw
There are no official draw since only 6 teams participating in this competition. All teams are automatically drawn to one group.

Results 
All times are Malaysia Standard Time (UTC+8).

Group stage

Final round
5th place playoff

Bronze medal match

Gold medal match

See also
Women's tournament

References

External links
Official website

Men